One million is the natural number following 999,999 and preceding 1,000,001.

One million or million may also refer to:

 A Greek or Byzantine mile, composed of 8 stades (furlongs) or 5000 Greek feet
 For the year 1,000,000 AD see Timeline of the far future

Entertainment
 "DC One Million", a crossover storyline published by DC Comics in 1998
 One Million B.C., a 1940 American film directed by Hal Roach
 One Million Years B.C., a 1966 British film directed by Don Chaffey, remake of the 1940 American film

Music
 "1.000.000" (song), by Alexandra Stan
 "1,000,000", song by R.E.M. from the Chronic Town EP
 "1,000,000" (song), song by Nine Inch Nails The Slip
 1000000 (Million) (song), a 2016 song by Bon IVer

Other topics
 Million, Kentucky, a community in the United States
 The Travels of Marco Polo, or The Million, a transcription by Rustichello da Pisa of Marco Polo's travels between 1271 and 1298

See also

 Milion, the Byzantine zero-mile marker in present-day Istanbul
 myr (million years), the unit for Mya (million years ago)
 
 
 
 
 
 Millions (disambiguation)